Kausi is a village in Märjamaa Parish, Rapla County in western Estonia.

References

Villages in Rapla County